The Sigynnae were an obscure nomadic people of antiquity who were part of the Scythian cultures.

Location
The Sigynnae were a nomadic people of uncertain, but possibly Iranian or pre-Iranian origin, who lived north of the middle Danube river. The Greek historian Herodotus called them the only tribe living "north of Thrace," and Apollonius of Rhodes located them alongside groups of the Sindi who had migrated into Europe and the otherwise unknown Grauci in the "plain of Laurion", which is likely the eastern part of the Pannonian Basin.

History
Herodotus reported that the Sigynnae claimed to have been colonists from Media who had travelled to Europe via the Caucasus Mountains, the latter place being where Strabo recorded another people named Sigynnae alongside the Derbices, the Hyrcanians, and the Tapyri. This origin via a migration via the Caucasus and the Pontic Steppe into the Pannonian Basin is accepted by modern scholars and supported by archaeological evidence, with the most prevalent hypothesis being that they were a tribe of the North Caucasus region who were displaced westwards into the Pannonian Basin in the 8th century BCE by the westward migration of the Scythians, although it is still unknown whether the Sigynnae migration route went through Moldavia and then Wallachia, or through the forest steppe and the northern Carpathian Mountains.

The Sigynnae shared many similarities with the Scythian peoples, such as dressing in "Median" fashion, that is, the use of tunics with sleeves and of trousers (notably, trousers were not worn by the populations of Central Europe before the arrival of the steppe nomads), due to which they were known in the northern Danubian region for having "Persian" or "Median" customs. The Sigynnae also owned small shaggy ponies with flat noses which could not be ridden by horseman, but which were used in four-horse teams to pull the carts in which the Sigynnae travelled.

Beyond these few mentions, barely anything is known about the Sigynnae.

Archaeology
The presence of the Sigynnae has been connected to the Mezőcsát culture of the northern plains of the middle Danube basin, whose beginnings reach back to before the 6th century BCE, as well as with the southern group of the Vekerzug culture. The Sigynnae appear to have occupied the Pannonian basin during the Novocherkassk culture in the 8th century BCE and contributed to the formation of the Mezőcsát culture, and later the Vekerzug culture arose from the Sigynnae coming under Scythian influence.

Various archaeological finds have corroborated Herodotus's reports on the Sigynnae: the people of the Mezőcsát culture and of the Vekerzug culture wore "Median" or "Persian" clothing, that is trousers and sleeved-tunics, and did not use the fibulae and pins required to wear the traditional local clothing then worn throughout the Danube basin in the 6th to 5th centuries BCE; the skeletons of sixteen small Tarpan horses were found in the tumuli graves at Szentes-Vekerzug. These finds moreover attest to a connection between the people of the Vekerzug culture (the Sigynnae) and cultures from Asia.

Further evidence of connections between the Vekerzug culture and Asiatic cultures consist objects of Near Eastern origin, and of pintaders, that is clay stamps used to mark tattooed pictures on a person's skin, which, outside of the Vekerzug culture, are attested in Transcaucasia and the North Caucasus, especially in the Kuban culture.

Recent commentary
In the 19th and 20th centuries, some scholars attempted to connect the Sigynnae with the Romani people due to an alleged similarity of the name  with the Hungarian name for the Romani, . These hypotheses have since been discredited and are no longer considered as having any validity.

See also
Iazyges
 Scythian cultures

References

Sources

Historical Iranian peoples
Ancient tribes in Hungary
Scythian tribes
Tribes described primarily by Herodotus